Teo Castellanos is the founder and Artistic Director of D-Projects, a contemporary Dance/Theater company.  D-Projects original work fuses world culture, religion and music, examining social issues through performance.  D-Projects has toured South America and China and in 2011 toured in the U.S. with Scratch & Burn, a peace ritual, based on the war and funeral rituals of the Zulu tribe of South Africa using elements of Butoh, Maori war dance, Tibetan Buddhism, Yoruba chants and hip-hop vocabulary.

Biography
Born in Puerto Rico and raised in Miami, Teo Castellanos is an actor/writer/director who works in theater, film and television. Teo received his B.F.A. in Theater from Florida Atlantic University under a full scholarship where he studied with four time Tony Award winner Zoe Caldwell.  He is author of War, Revolution, and the Projects, a one-man trilogy, which he has toured on the East Coast, as well as his one-man show NE 2nd Avenue based on Miami characters, which was commissioned and produced by Miami Light Project as part of their 2001-2002 Contemporary Performance Series and went on to be produced by Coconut Grove Playhouse in Miami. Teo Castellanos’ NE 2nd Avenue was awarded the International Cultural Exchange Grant by Miami-Dade County Cultural Affairs, which allowed Teo to bring it to the 2003 Edinburgh Fringe Festival where it won the Fringe First Award, the most prestigious theater award of the festival (past winners include Emma Thompson, Rowan Atkinson and Danny Hoch).  It was also nominated for a South Florida Carbonell Award for Best New Work and was awarded Best Solo Performance by Miami New Times, and Best Original Play by Miami Beach Sun Post and has toured throughout the U.S and Europe.  City Link Magazine also awarded Teo Playwright of the Year 2006. Teo has lectured and taught theater workshops at Temple University, University of Massachusetts, Saint Michaels College, Santa Fe College, University of South Florida, Florida Memorial University and Miami- Dade College as well as throughout several states and the U.S. Virgin Islands. Teo is currently director of RAP (Rites And Passages) a men’s prison theater/drumming program at ArtSpring, and Executive Producer of Miami Project Hip Hop (MPH), an annual event produced by Miami Light Project that honors Hip Hop roots and aesthetics.  He is co-coach of the Tigertail Productions Spoken Word Team that competes annually at Brave New Voices, a national competition produced by Youth Speaks. Teo is the recipient of the State of Florida Individual Artist Fellowship 2005.  He is a former member of the men of color theater collective, The Hittite Empire, based in Los Angeles, with which he has toured in the U.S. and England. He also toured Cuba as part of the Parece Blanca cast, a theater production that brought together for the first time in history Cuban artists in exile to work with artists living on the island to form a unified cast. He is a member of The Screen Actors Guild and is Associate Member of Society of Stage Directors and Choreographers, and is represented in Europe by Universal Arts. His big screen work includes acting opposite John Leguizamo in the 2005 film Empire. Teo is also a Mime & Movement instructor at Mater Academy Charter High.

Works

Directing

Acting Film/Television

Notes and references

External links
 Official web site
 

American theatre directors
Living people
Year of birth missing (living people)